Rudolf Rydström (11 April 1886 – 23 May 1929) was a Swedish wrestler. He competed in the lightweight event at the 1912 Summer Olympics.

References

1886 births
1929 deaths
Olympic wrestlers of Sweden
Wrestlers at the 1912 Summer Olympics
Swedish male sport wrestlers
Sportspeople from Stockholm